WPEH (1420 AM) is a radio station broadcasting a country music format. Licensed to Louisville, Georgia, United States.  The station is currently owned by Peach Broadcasting Co., Inc. and features programming from CNN Radio and Westwood One.

References

External links

PEH
Radio stations established in 1974